Tongyeong Interchange, shortly Tongyeong IC, is an interchange located in Yongnam-myeon, Tongyeong, South Gyeongsang, South Korea. Tongyeong–Daejeon Expressway (No. 35) and Namhaean-daero, part of National Route 14 and Gukjido 58, meet here. The type of interchange is trumpet.

Roads

History 
 12 December 2005: It opened with Tongyeong ~ Jinju segment of Tongyeong–Daejeon Expressway and It was named East Tongyeong Interchange.
 1 January 2007: The name was changed to Tongyeong Interchange.

Location 
 Gyeongsangnam-do
 Tongyeong-si
 Yongnam-myeon
 Dongdal-ri

Tongyeong Tollgate 

Tongyeong Tollgate is a tollgate that marks the start of Tongyeong–Daejeon Expressway in the Republic of Korea. It is located in Dongdal-ri, Yongnam-myeon, Tongyeong City, South Gyeongsang Province.

In popular culture 
The tollgate was shown in the episode 1 of the drama Who Are You: School 2015 which was broadcast by KBS in 2015.

References 

Buildings and structures in South Gyeongsang Province
Expressway interchanges in South Korea
Tongyeong–Daejeon Expressway